Bohinjska Češnjica is a settlement in the Municipality of Bohinj in the Upper Carniola region of Slovenia.

Name
The name Bohinjska Češnjica literally means 'Češnjica in the Bohinj region'. The village was attested in historical sources as Chersdorf in 1253, Cherstorff in 1464, and Kersdorff in 1494. Like similar names (e.g., Češnjice, Češnjevek, Črešnjevci, etc.), the name is derived from the common noun češnja 'wild cherry', referring to the local vegetation.  The name of the settlement was changed from Češnjica to Bohinjska Češnjica in 1952.

Climate

References

External links

Bohinjska Češnjica at Geopedia

Populated places in the Municipality of Bohinj